David L. Franklin Jr. (born September 28, 1977) is a former American football wide receiver in the National Football League who played for the New Orleans Saints. He played college football for the Tulane Green Wave.

References

1977 births
Living people
American football wide receivers
New Orleans Saints players
Tulane Green Wave football players